David Gil may refer to:

David Gil (footballer) (born 1994), Spanish footballer
David Gil (linguist) (born 1953), British linguist